Al-Farabi Kazakh National University , also called KazGU or KazNU, is a university in Almaty, Kazakhstan. Named after the Eastern philosopher and scholar al-Farabi, it is one of the country's largest universities.

KazNU is the oldest classical university of the Republic established by a Decree of the Kazakh Regional Committee (KRC) office dated November 13, 1933. One year after Kazakhstan's 1990 declaration of independence, the name was changed to Al-Farabi Kazakh State University. According to the QS World University Rankings 2021 KazNU takes 165th place in the rating of the best universities of the world.

In 2001, the government classified it as a "national" university. More than 20,000 students, post-graduates and PhD students study at KazNU, and there are more than 2500 faculty members working at KazNU, including 400 doctors of science, professors and more than 800 candidates of science and associate professors. Like other universities founded under the Soviet system, it is highly centralized.

In 2021, Al-Farabi Kazakh National University was named as one of the Top 500 Universities in the World.

Campus
The university has its own campus, so-called "Kazgugrad", on land between Timiryazev Street, Al-Farabi Avenue, the "Yessentai" ("Vesnovka") river, and the Botanical Garden. The main building (GUK) is 15 stories tall and hosts the university administration as well as the History, Economics, Law, Philology and Journalism departments.

Al-Farabi Kazakh National University has the largest campus in Kazakhstan with an area of 100 hectares, in one of the most beautiful areas of Almaty. The education infrastructure of the campus consists of 13 education buildings with a total area of 165,000 m² and scientific laboratories with a total area of 18,940 m².

There are seventeen dormitories on campus and four more departments: Philosophy and Political Science, Oriental Studies, Preparatory and International Relations in the second, smaller campus located at the intersection of Karasay Batyr - Masanchi streets.

The departments of Physics, Mechanics-Mathematics, and Chemistry were formerly in the second campus; in 2011 they moved to newly constructed buildings on the first.

History 

January 15, 1934, is the day of the official opening of Kazakh State University, which was established at the basis of the Pedagogical Institute by the decree of the Council of Peoples’ Commissars of USSR and VKPb Kazakh regional committee. On December 2 of the same year KazSU was named after the famous Soviet party and state leader S.M. Kirov.

In January 1934, the first entrance exams at the faculties of Biology, Physics and Mathematics were held; in September they were held at the Faculty of Chemistry. In 1937, the first Faculty of Humanities – the Faculty of Foreign Languages was established; a year later, the Faculty of Philology. In May 1941, as a result of joining with the University of the Kazakh Communist Institute of Journalism, the Faculty of Journalism was established.

After the severe years of war, new faculties began to open. In August 1947, the Faculty of Geography was established and, in 1949, the faculties of Philosophy and Economics. As a result of the joining with the Alma-Ata Institute of Law in 1955, the Faculty of Law was established.

During the same period, a strong scientific educational and methodological base emerged at the university. By the mid-1980s there were 98 departments, 43 scientific research laboratories and 9 scientific research groups at KazSU. The faculty staff consisted of 1180 people; among the faculty staff there were 30 academicians and AS KazSSR correspondent members, more than 100 doctors, professors, more than 600 science candidates, lecturers. Human resources were trained on 21 specialties and 74 specializations.

Faculties 
 Faculty of Mechanics and Mathematics
 Faculty of Chemistry and Chemical Technology
 Faculty of Physics and Technologies
 Faculty of Informational Technology
 Faculty of Biology and Biotechnology
 Faculty of Geography and Environmental Sciences
 Faculty of History, Archeology and Ethnology
 Faculty of Philology and World Languages
 Faculty of Journalism
 Faculty of International Relations
 Oriental Studies Faculty
 Faculty of Philosophy and Political Science
 High School of Economics and Business
 Law Faculty
 Preparatory Faculty for Foreign Students
 Higher School of Medicine

Faculty of Biology and Biotechnology 
The Faculty of Biology is the oldest in the university, was organized since the founding of KazSU in 1934. Currently, in accordance with the conducted scientific research, modern educational programs of training specialists, is called the Faculty of Biology and Biotechnology. Today it is a major innovative scientific and educational center, where in 2 research institutes (biology and biotechnology problems and environmental problems) conduct fundamental and applied research in many areas of modern biology, ecology, biotechnology, biomedicine, sports, in which both teachers and students are involved. The faculty has 4 departments: Biodiversity and Bioresources, Biotechnology, Molecular Biology and Genetics, Biophysics and Biomedicine, as well as Bioclinic and Agrobiological Station. An important subdivision of the faculty is the Biological Museum with more than 5 thousand specimens of mass, endemic and rare species, which are unique objects of research.

Faculty of Physics and Technology 
The Faculty of Physics and Technology is a continuation of the traditions of the Faculty of Physics and Mathematics, one of the first departments of the university. Today, the faculty is the center of a physics and technology cluster, which includes three research institutes.

Under the guidance of highly qualified teaching staff talented students receive fundamental education in three languages, Kazakh, Russian and English, and from early courses are actively involved in research on topical issues of modern physics and technology within the framework of established scientific schools. The faculty developed entirely new curricula that correspond to the programs of the leading universities in the world, implemented an innovative chain to accompany the development of scientific and technological research from ideas to their implementation Increasing the number of research programs, creating new courses in the most relevant areas of training specialists, expanding the material base of the faculty.

Faculty of Chemistry and Chemical Technology 
The faculty of chemistry and chemical technology of Al-Farabi Kazakh National University is one of the first departments of the university, opened in 1934. The faculty occupies a separate 5-storey academic building, has two research institutes. Training is conducted in 3 (state, Russian and English) languages on the basis of 70 laboratories of 5 departments and 4 computer labs, equipped with modern equipment. Specialists are trained by highly qualified lecturers and employees of the enterprises, including 45 doctors of sciences, 85 candidates of sciences and 40 PhDs. All Bachelor's, Master's and PhD programs are accredited by ASIIN agency (Germany). The faculty trains specialists under 2-diploma programs with Belgorod University, Chinese University of Oil, Taipei University, Saitama University (Japan), D. I. Mendeleev Russian Chemical Technology University, Ufa Petroleum Technical University. Graduates take courses in Lyon-1 (France), Valencia (Spain), Poland, Romania, etc. Students of the faculty have internships at companies in the chemical, petrochemical, pharmaceutical, and metallurgical industries, such as Karachaganak Petroleum Operating JSC, Atyrau oil refinery" LLP, "SNPS-Aktobemunaigas" JSC, "KazPhosphat" LLP, STC of "KazTransOil" JSC, "TsinKaz" LLP, "DorPlast Invest" LLP, "Zerde-Fito" LLP, etc.

Faculty of Philology and World Languages 
The Faculty of Philology and World Languages, which was founded by such outstanding personalities as M. Auezov, A. Margulan, B. Kenzhebayev, and M. Balakaev, has a great history and is rich in traditions. The faculty has six departments, five of which: Department of Kazakh Linguistics, Kazakh Literature and Theory of Literature, Russian Philology and World Literature, General Linguistics and European Languages, Foreign Philology and Translation Studies are graduating departments, which train future specialists. The Chair of Foreign Languages provides qualified training in world languages.

The department has close ties with major creative unions, research institutes, where students successfully complete their research internships. The departments, institutes and laboratories employ teachers and scientists who are well known in our country and abroad. Special attention is paid to academic mobility. Only in 2016-2017 academic year foreign professors worked at the faculty: Snodgras N. (USA), Seth Agbo (Canada), Margaret Dorline (Holland), Hancock M (USA), Anatoly Kim (Russia), Rafael Velez-Nunez (Spain), Nussier M. (France), Najie Yildiz (Turkey), Edgar Hofmann (Austria); 26 American students were trained under the Flagship program (USA).

Faculty of Journalism 
The faculty has been training journalistic personnel since 1934. For more than 84 years of its existence, the faculty has trained 16,000 qualified specialists for various types of media.

Graduates of the faculty work practically in all periodicals, on television and radio, in publishing houses and foreign correspondents, in senior positions in the government, and head the editorial boards of many national and regional newspapers and magazines. During the difficult period of transition, the faculty of journalism managed not only to preserve but also to strengthen its invaluable potential: the strongest faculty and the unique training base. The faculty has highly qualified teachers, well-known scientists and media practitioners, among them 9 doctors and more than 30 candidates of science. The scientific foundation was laid by the founders of Kazakh journalism theory, such as H. Bekhozhin, T. Amandosov, T. Kozhakeev, M. Barmankulov, M. Dmitrovsky, Y. Krikunov, and others.

Faculty of Information Technology 
On January 15, 2018, the Faculty of Information Technology was opened. The mission of the IT faculty is to train world-class, highly qualified specialists for the dynamically developing IT sector of the national economy. The strategic goal of the new faculty is to create a scientific and educational center that makes a significant contribution in the global and national educational space in the training of IT specialists, taking into account the needs of the modern IT market and the requirements of professional and educational standards.

Faculty of History, Archaeology and Ethnology 
The Faculty of History, Archaeology and Ethnology is the center of training highly qualified specialists in national and foreign history, archaeology, ethnology, museum management and monuments protection, archival science and librarianship.

In 1948, the history department was transformed into a separate department. The distinguished historians-academicians A. M. Pankratova, S. M. Pokrovsky and corresponding member of the Kazakh SSR Academy of Sciences, doctor of historical sciences, professor E. B. Bekmakhanov stood at the origins of the faculty.

Today, the staff of the faculty consists of 80 people: 27 of them doctor of sciences, 40 candidates of historical sciences, 5 PhDs. To date, the training of specialists is conducted in a three-stage system: Bachelor, Master, PhD.

Faculty of Philosophy and Political Science 
The history of the Philosophy and Political Science faculty dates back to 1947, when the Department of Psychology and Logic was founded, and then in 1949, when the Philosophy and Economics Departments were established at KazSU named after S. M. Kirov. The organizer of the Philosophy Department was N. P. Dardikin, a graduate of the Red Professorship Institute of the Central Committee of the All-Union Communist Party. In 1951, the Philosophy and Economics Departments were merged into the Philosophy and Economics Department, with F. A. Zherebyatiev, candidate of economic sciences, associate professor, being appointed as its head. The Philosophy and Economics Department existed until 1954 when it was closed due to the fact that the prerogative of training philosophical personnel was given only to the leading universities: the Moscow, Leningrad, and Kiev State Universities.

From the early 1970s, foreign students began to study at the Department. The first were 13 students from Cuba, and then there were students from many countries in Asia and Africa. About 400 qualified specialists were trained by the Faculty for Cuba, Afghanistan, Laos, Cambodia, Burkina Faso, Mongolia, India, and Pakistan. The Faculty was the center of philosophical education in the Central Asian region, in particular, it trained personnel for the Republic of Kyrgyzstan. In 1991, the faculty was divided into the Department of Philosophy and Political Science and the Department of Economics and Sociology.

High School of Economics and Business 
The Higher School of Economics and Business is one of the oldest divisions of Al-Farabi Kazakh National University. The University Faculty of Economics was established in 1949. In 1951 by the decision of the Academic Council of Kazakh State University two previously independent faculties (economic and philosophical) were merged into a single Faculty of Philosophy and Economics. The Faculty of Economics underwent significant qualitative and quantitative changes due to the establishment of the Almaty Institute of National Economy in 1963.

Faculty of Law 
In 1955, the Faculty of Law was established on the basis of the Almaty Institute of Law in the state higher education institution of Kazakhstan. During its 63-year history, it has trained about 35,000 legal professionals: judges, prosecutors, law enforcement and public security officers, notaries, lawyers and jurists. Every year about 15 scientists and professors of the faculty undergo scientific training in foreign universities and research centers. Over the last 5 years scientists and teachers of the faculty have published more than 1000 scientific and educational works.

Faculty of Oriental Studies 
Education in Oriental languages (particularly Arabic) in the walls of the university begins in the 70s of XX century. The Decree of the Government of the Kazakh SSR from May 15, 1989 on the basis of the Department of History of Asian and African countries and the Department of Arabic language was established Faculty of Oriental Studies, which is currently the largest center of the country to prepare highly qualified specialists with knowledge of Oriental languages. Specialists-orientalists were in demand by the time itself, as it was the period of the formation of independent Kazakhstan, the formation of its statehood and the establishment of official diplomatic contacts with foreign countries.

Faculty of International Relations 
The Faculty of International Relations was established in 1995 by Decree № 88 of 28.04.1995, in accordance with the decision of the Academic Council of the University and at the request of the Ministry of Foreign Affairs of the Republic of Kazakhstan. The faculty is working to prepare highly qualified and competitive specialists in international relations, international law, regional studies and global economics.

On the presentation of Professor Zharas Umarovich Ibrashev to the then Rector of Kazakh State University named after al-Farabi, Professor K.N. Naribayev and the Minister of Foreign Affairs of the Republic of Kazakhstan T. Suleimenov, some changes were made in the Department of General History, of which he was head. First, the specialty "History of Asia and Africa" was separated for the Faculty of Oriental Studies, then the specialty "History of the Ancient World and Middle Ages" was allocated in an independent department, followed by the formation of the Department of Modern and Contemporary History and International Relations. The Department of History of the Faculty of Oriental Studies, the specialty "History of the Ancient World and Middle Ages" was separated into an independent department, followed by the formation of the Department of New and Modern History and International Relations.

Faculty of pre-university education 
The Faculty of Pre-University Education (FED) was established in 2011 on the basis of the preparatory faculty for foreign nationals, which was founded in 1985. The university has long maintained close contacts in the field of education with more than a hundred countries around the world. At present the university continues to develop and improve its international relations, it is steadily integrating into the European educational space.

For years the faculty has trained more than 7000 foreigners from more than 100 countries of the world: representatives of the Kazakh Diaspora from near and far abroad countries, foreign students on the international programs of interuniversity exchange, trainees of foreign companies, embassies, the international organizations. The faculty cooperates with embassies and consulates of different countries: USA, Japan, Islamic Republic of Afghanistan, South Korea, Mongolia, Spain, Turkey, People's Republic of China, Iran and others.

Since 2001, the Department successfully implements two presidential programs: since 2001, more than 2000 students-representatives of the foreign Kazakh diaspora were trained to enter the universities of Kazakhstan, since 2010, more than 420 students from the IRA were trained to enter colleges and universities of Kazakhstan. Also, the faculty is preparing for comprehensive testing and unified national testing (CTA and UNT).

Research Institutes 
The university also has research institutes:
 Institute of State and Law
 Research Institute of Experimental and Theoretical Physics (RI of ETF)
 Research Institute of New Chemical Technologies and Materials (RI of NCTM)
 Center of Physical and Chemical Methods of Research and Analysis (CPCMA)
 Research Institute of Biology and Biotechnology (RI of BB)
 Institute for Advanced Studies (IAS)
 Confucius Institute
 Science and Technology Park (Technopark)
 National Open Nanotechnology Laboratory (NONL)

Rankings 

In 2009, the Al-Farabi Kazakh National University was included in the list of the best higher institutions in the world according to the prestigious Times University ranking. It entered the list of 600 best universities out of a total of 16,000 participants. At the time of entering the rating, more than 20 thousand students from various countries of the near and far abroad studied at the university.

Al-Farabi Kazakh National University was ranked 18th among countries of the emerging Europe and central Asia region in QS EECA University Rankings of 2020 and 207th worldwide according to the QS World University Rankings in 2020.

Partner universities
  Dongguk University, Republic of Korea
  Hankuk University of Foreign Studies, Republic of Korea
  Pusan University of Foreign Studies, Republic of Korea
  Soongsil University, Republic of Korea
  Catholic University of Daegu, Republic of Korea
  Ching Yun University, Taiwan
  Open International University for Complementary Medicines

Notable alumni
 Kairat Abdrakhmanov, Kazakhstan's Minister of Foreign Affairs 
 Murat Aitkhozhin, President of Kazakhstan Academy of Sciences
 Yerik Asanbayev, former Vice-President of Kazakhstan
 Kanat Auyesbay, Kazakh newsreader
 Oralkhan Bokeev, Kazakh writer
 Gulzhana Karagusova, Kazakhstan's Minister of Social Justice
 Abish Kekilbayev, Chairman of the Republic of Kazakhstan Supreme Soviet, and Secretary of State of Kazakhstan
 Aigul Kemelbayeva, Kazakh writer
 German Kim, head of the Department of Korean Studies and one of the leading internationally recognised scholars of the Koryo-saram
 Michał Łabenda, Polish ambassador to Azerbaijan, Mongolia and Egypt
 Mukhtar Magauin, Kazakh writer and publicist
 Fuat Mansurov, Kazakh mathematician and conductor
 Gulzhan Moldazhanova, Kazakh businesswoman
 Maksut Narikbaev, Chairman of the Supreme Court of Kazakhstan
 Oleg Novachuk, Kazakh businessman, currently Chief Executive of Kazakhmys
 Abdizhamil Nurpeisov, Kazakh poet and writer
 Rafika Nurtazina, Hero of Socialist Labour
 Gulnara Sarsenova, Kazakh film producer
 Kanat Saudabayev, Kazakhstan's former Secretary of State and Minister of Foreign Affairs
 Olzhas Suleimenov, former Speaker of Kazakhstan's parliament and poet
 Yessengaly Raushanov, Kazakh writer and poet.
 Igor Rogov, head of the Constitutional Council
 Tauman Torekhanov, Kazakh journalist, editor and writer
 Zhanseit Tuimebayev, Kazakhstan's former Minister of Education and former ambassador to Russia
 Bakhytzhan Zhumagulov, Kazakhstan's Minister of Education

See also
 Institute of Plant Biology and Biotechnology

References

External links
 Official homepage
 Official homepage 
 Official homepage 

1934 establishments in the Kazakh Autonomous Socialist Soviet Republic

Educational institutions established in 1934
Universities and institutes established in the Soviet Union
Universities in Kazakhstan
Smart cities